Malo is an unincorporated community in Ferry County, Washington, United States. Malo has a post office with ZIP code 99150 and had a 2010 census population of 28. The community has the state's largest secondhand store, Malo Trading Post.

Demographics

The city of Malo had an estimated 28 people in 10 households, in which six were family households. Average household size was 2.5, and an average family size of three. There were 18 housing units, with a median house value of $125,000. The median age of these units was 73 years. The median age was 58.2. 2.6% of people were registered Democrats, and 97.9% of people were registered Republicans. 26.55% of people were religious, and the median household income was $45,079.

References

Unincorporated communities in Ferry County, Washington
Unincorporated communities in Washington (state)
Populated places in the Okanagan Country